Sir William Owen, 4th Baronet (1697?–1781), of Orielton, Pembrokeshire, was a Welsh politician who sat in the House of Commons for 52 years from 1722 to 1774. 

Owen was the eldest son of Sir Arthur Owen, 3rd Baronet, and his wife Emma Williams, daughter of Sir William Williams, 1st Baronet. He matriculated at New College, Oxford, on 16 June 1713, aged 16.  He married Elizabeth Lloyd, daughter of Thomas Lloyd of Grove, Pembrokeshire, on 12 December 1725. He married as his second wife his cousin Anne Williams, daughter of John Williams of Chester, on 26 July 1728.

Owen was returned as Member of Parliament (MP) for Pembroke Boroughs on the Orielton interest at a by-election on 13 November 1722. He voted with the Administration in every recorded division. He was returned unopposed in the general elections of 1727 and 1734 and won a contest in 1741. At the 1747 British general election he was returned for Pembroke Boroughs again and also for Pembrokeshire. He opted to sit for Pembrokeshire.

Owen succeeded his father to the baronetcy in 1753, inheriting the family seat of Orielton House. He was returned unopposed again for Pembrokeshire at the 1754 British general election. At the 1761 British general election, he was returned again for Pembroke Boroughs. He retired from Parliament at the general election of 1774. He succeeded the previous baronet as Lord Lieutenant of Pembrokeshire in 1753, retaining the position until 1775.

He married twice and had 2 sons and 3 daughters. 
Owen died on 7 May 1781 leaving two sons and three daughters. He was succeeded in the baronetcy by his son Hugh.

References

 

1690s births
1781 deaths
People from Pembrokeshire
Alumni of New College, Oxford
Members of the Parliament of Great Britain for Welsh constituencies
British MPs 1722–1727
British MPs 1727–1734
British MPs 1734–1741
British MPs 1741–1747
British MPs 1747–1754
British MPs 1754–1761
British MPs 1761–1768
British MPs 1768–1774
Baronets in the Baronetage of England
Lord-Lieutenants of Pembrokeshire